Year 196 (CXCVI) was a leap year starting on Thursday (link will display the full calendar) of the Julian calendar. At the time, it was known as the Year of the Consulship of Dexter and Messalla (or, less frequently, year 949 Ab urbe condita). The denomination 196 for this year has been used since the early medieval period, when the Anno Domini calendar era became the prevalent method in Europe for naming years.

Events 
 By place 
 Roman Empire 
 Emperor Septimius Severus attempts to assassinate Clodius Albinus but fails, causing Albinus to retaliate militarily. 
 Emperor Septimius Severus captures and sacks Byzantium; the city is rebuilt and regains its previous prosperity.
 In order to assure the support of the Roman legion in Germany on his march to Rome, Clodius Albinus is declared Augustus by his army while crossing Gaul. 
 Hadrian's wall in Britain is partially destroyed.

 China 
 First year of the Jian'an Era, during the reign of the Xian Emperor of the Han.
 The Xian Emperor returns to war-ravaged Luoyang and seeks the protection of warlord Cao Cao. He is advised to move the capital to Xuchang; the emperor becomes a pawn in the hands of the Chinese warlords.

 Korea 
 Naehae becomes king of Silla.

Births 
 Cao Chong, son of Cao Cao (d. 208)

Deaths 
 Beolhyu, Korean ruler of Silla
 Cao Bao, Chinese general and governor
 Chizhi Shizhu Hou, Chinese puppet ruler (b. 150)
 Zhou Xin, Chinese official and politician

References